Amirhossein Bagherpour (born November 11, 1997) is an Iranian footballer who plays as a forward for Iranian club Naft Masjed Soleyman in the Persian Gulf Pro League.

References

Living people
1997 births
Association football forwards
Iranian footballers
Foolad FC players
People from Babol
Sportspeople from Mazandaran province